Chhoti Bahen is a 1959 Indian Hindi-language film that stars Nanda in the title role, Balraj Sahni and Rehman. It is a remake of the 1952 Tamil film En Thangai.

Plot 
Rajendra lives a poor lifestyle along with his younger collegian brother Shekhar, as well a younger sister Meena. He is in love with a school-teacher, and both hope to get married after Meena and Shekhar's marriages. Luck shines upon them and Meena's marriage is arranged with Dr. Ramesh, while Shekhar decides to wed Shobha, the only daughter of a wealthy man obsessed with horse-racing. Rajendra mortgages his house with his paternal uncle. Then things turn sour after Meena loses her vision; the wedding gets canceled, and Rajendra is humiliated by Ramesh's dad. Rajendra decides to remain single to look after Meena, and permits Shekhar and Shobha to get married. The marriage takes place, and Shobha moves in. Shortly thereafter misunderstandings crop up, and lead to arguments, with Shekhar and Shobha moving out to live with Shobha's dad. Then Rajendra is fired from his job, his paternal uncle takes over the house, and asks him to leave. Homeless, they turn to Shekhar for help, but he refuses to assist them in any way. Then Rajendra falls ill and gets separated from his sister, while Shekhar takes to horse-racing and alcohol, and a path that will only lead to self-destruction.

Cast 
 Balraj Sahni as Rajendra
 Nanda as Meena
 Dhumal as Sukhiya
 Mehmood as Mahesh
 Shubha Khote as Sheela
 Shyama as Shobha
 Rehman as Shekhar
 Kanchanamala as Chanchal
 Hari Shivdasani as Ramesh's father
 Badri Prasad as Shobha's father
 Kunwar Keshav as Doctor
 Radhakrishan as Mahesh's father
 Sudesh Kumar as Dr. Ramesh
 Veena (actress) as Yashoda

Soundtrack 

Music composed by Shankar-Jaikishan and lyrics by Shailendra and Hasrat Jaipuri.

Awards and nominations 
 Nomination Filmfare Award for Best Film
 Nomination Filmfare Award for Best Director – Prasad
 Nomination Filmfare Award for Best Supporting Actor – Mehmood as Mahesh
 Nomination Filmfare Award for Best Music Director – Shankar-Jaikishan
 Nomination Filmfare Award for Best Playback Singer – Lata Mangeshkar for the song "Bhaiya Mere Rakhi Ke Bandhan Ko"

References 

1959 films
1950s Hindi-language films
Films directed by L. V. Prasad
Films scored by Shankar–Jaikishan
Hindi remakes of Tamil films